Ásgeir Elíasson (22 November 1949 – 9 September 2007) was a football manager and coach of the Iceland national football team between 1991 and 1995. He was manager of  Fram Reykjavik for twelve years.  Ásgeir played games for the Iceland national football team in three sports: football, handball and volleyball, before starting as professional manager.

References 
Specific

General

Eliasson, Asgeir
Eliasson, Asgeir
Icelandic football managers
Icelandic footballers
Knattspyrnufélagið Fram players
Iceland international footballers
Iceland national football team managers
Knattspyrnufélagið Fram managers
Fimleikafélag Hafnarfjarðar managers
Ungmennafélagið Víkingur players
Eliasson, Asgeir